Phantoms of the High Seas is the tenth album by dark ambient duo Nox Arcana. The theme of the album is pirate lore and stories of ghost ships. Instrumentation includes deep bass horns, pounding drums, string instruments, and narration by Joseph Vargo telling the tale of a doomed pirate vessel called The Tempest. The instrumentals are accompanied by sound effects that include a howling wind and the snap of sails, the sound of creaking as of a wooden boat left derelict at sea, an eerie yet alluring chorus like that of a siren calling sailors to their doom, male voices of the ship's crew as they call out to the beat of a dirge while rowing, and thunderous sounds of cannon fire.

In the spirit of Nox Arcana's ongoing quest to incorporate puzzles into their cd packaging, the album artwork contains a treasure map and several ciphers.

From the liner notes: "Hearken ye pirates and black-hearted sea dogs... Nox Arcana beckons ye to set sail upon the haunted seas where ghost ships prowl the misty dead of night and ancient treasure lies buried far below the endless waves. This epic soundscape explores the mysteries of the deep with dynamic orchestrations, ghostly melodies, pirate anthems and gothic choirs. Set a course for high adventure!"

The release date for this album coincides with Columbus Day.

Tracks
Music composed and performed by Joseph Vargo and William Piotrowski. Lyrics by Joseph Vargo.

 "Dead Men Tell No Tales" — 2:26
 "The High Seas" — 2:56
 "Edge of the World" — 4:21
 "Pirates" — 5:10
 "The Gallows Jig" — 1:50
 "Crossfire" — 3:00
 "Oblivion" — 3:00
 "Racing the Wind" — 4:15
 "Siren’s Call" — 2:33
 "Trove Island" — 3:23
 "Against the Storm" — 3:21
 "Lords of the Deep" — 2:27
 "Maelstrom" — 1:22
 "Out of the Mist" — 3:02
 "Still Waters" — 2:22
 "Black Sails" — 3:01
 "Fate of the Tempest" — 4:11
 "The Fog Rolls In" — 1:32
 "Widow’s Harbor" — 2:56
 "Ghost Ship" — 2:47
 "Skull and Crossbones" — 3:11 (+hidden track)

Notes
Vocals on "Fate of the Tempest" were performed by Ty Cook.

References

External links
 Nox Arcana's official website
[ Phantoms of the High Seas] at Allmusic

Nox Arcana albums
2008 albums